In mathematics, a holomorphic function is a complex-valued function of one or more complex variables that is complex differentiable in a neighbourhood of each point in a domain in complex coordinate space . The existence of a complex derivative in a neighbourhood is a very strong condition: it implies that a holomorphic function is infinitely differentiable and locally equal to its own Taylor series (analytic). Holomorphic functions are the central objects of study in complex analysis.

Though the term analytic function is often used interchangeably with "holomorphic function", the word "analytic" is defined in a broader sense to denote any function (real, complex, or of more general type) that can be written as a convergent power series in a neighbourhood of each point in its domain. That all holomorphic functions are complex analytic functions, and vice versa, is a major theorem in complex analysis.

Holomorphic functions are also sometimes referred to as regular functions. A holomorphic function whose domain is the whole complex plane is called an entire function.

Definition 

This is the same definition as for the derivative of a real function, except that all  quantities are complex. This concept of complex differentiability shares several properties with real differentiability: it is linear and obeys the product rule, quotient rule, and chain rule.

A function may be complex differentiable at a point but not holomorphic at this point.

If continuity is not given, the converse is not necessarily true. A simple converse is that if  and  have continuous first partial derivatives and satisfy the Cauchy–Riemann equations, then  is holomorphic. A more satisfying converse, which is much harder to prove, is the Looman–Menchoff theorem: if  is continuous,  and  have first partial derivatives (but not necessarily continuous), and they satisfy the Cauchy–Riemann equations, then  is holomorphic.

Terminology 
The term holomorphic was introduced in 1875 by Charles Briot and Jean-Claude Bouquet, two of Augustin-Louis Cauchy's students, and derives from the Greek ὅλος (hólos) meaning "whole", and μορφή (morphḗ) meaning "form" or "appearance" or "type", in contrast to the term meromorphic derived from μέρος (méros) meaning "part". A holomorphic function resembles an entire function ("whole") in a domain of the complex plane while a meromorphic function (defined to mean holomorphic except at certain isolated poles), resembles a rational fraction ("part") of entire functions in a domain of the complex plane. Cauchy had instead used the term synectic.

Today, the term "holomorphic function" is sometimes preferred to "analytic function". An important result in complex analysis is that every holomorphic function is complex analytic, a fact that does not follow obviously from the definitions. The term "analytic" is however also in wide use.

Properties 
Because complex differentiation is linear and obeys the product, quotient, and chain rules, the sums, products and compositions of holomorphic functions are holomorphic, and the quotient of two holomorphic functions is holomorphic wherever the denominator is not zero.

If one identifies  with the real plane , then the holomorphic functions coincide with those functions of two real variables with continuous first derivatives which solve the Cauchy–Riemann equations, a set of two partial differential equations.

Cauchy's integral theorem implies that the contour integral of every holomorphic function along a loop vanishes:

Cauchy's integral formula states that every function holomorphic inside a disk is completely determined by its values on the disk's boundary. Then for every  in the interior of :

where the contour integral is taken counter-clockwise.

The derivative  can be written as a contour integral using Cauchy's differentiation formula:

In regions where the first derivative is not zero, holomorphic functions are conformal: they preserve angles and the shape (but not size) of small figures.

Every holomorphic function is analytic.

From an algebraic point of view, the set of holomorphic functions on an open set is a commutative ring and a complex vector space. Additionally, the set of holomorphic functions in an open set  is an integral domain if and only if the open set  is connected.  In fact, it is a locally convex topological vector space, with the seminorms being the suprema on compact subsets.

It follows from

Examples 
Euler's formula). The principal branch of the complex logarithm function  is holomorphic on the domain .

As a consequence of the Cauchy–Riemann equations, any real-valued holomorphic function must be constant. Therefore, the absolute value , the argument , the real part  and the imaginary part  are not holomorphic. Another typical example of a continuous function which is not holomorphic is the complex conjugate  (The complex conjugate is antiholomorphic.)

Several variables 
The definition of a holomorphic function generalizes to several complex variables in a straightforward way. The much deeper Hartogs' theorem proves that the continuity assumption is unnecessary:  is holomorphic if and only if it is holomorphic in each variable separately.

More generally, a function of several complex variables that is square integrable over every compact subset of its domain is analytic if and only if it satisfies the Cauchy–Riemann equations in the sense of distributions.

Functions of several complex variables are in some basic ways more complicated than functions of a single complex variable. For example, the region of convergence of a power series is not necessarily an open ball; these regions are logarithmically-convex Reinhardt domains, the simplest example of which is a polydisk.  However, they also come with some fundamental restrictions. Unlike functions of a single complex variable, the possible domains on which there are holomorphic functions that cannot be extended to larger domains are highly limited. Such a set is called a domain of holomorphy.

A complex differential -form  is holomorphic if and only if its antiholomorphic Dolbeault derivative is zero: .

Extension to functional analysis 

The concept of a holomorphic function can be extended to the infinite-dimensional spaces of functional analysis. For instance, the Fréchet or Gateaux derivative can be used to define a notion of a holomorphic function on a Banach space over the field of complex numbers.

See also 
 Antiderivative (complex analysis)
 Antiholomorphic function
 Biholomorphy
 Holomorphic separability
 Meromorphic function
 Quadrature domains
 Harmonic maps
 Harmonic morphisms
 Wirtinger derivatives

References

Further reading

External links 
 

Analytic functions